Taryn Hosking (born 28 June 1981) is a South African field hockey player who competed in the 2008 Summer Olympics.

References

External links

1981 births
South African people of British descent
Living people
South African female field hockey players
Olympic field hockey players of South Africa
Field hockey players at the 2008 Summer Olympics
Field hockey players at the 2006 Commonwealth Games
Commonwealth Games competitors for South Africa